Hokkien fried rice (also known as Fujian fried rice) is a popular Cantonese-style wok fried rice dish in many Chinese restaurants. It has a thick sauce poured and mixed over fried rice with egg. The sauce can include mushrooms, meat, vegetables, and other ingredients. 

Despite its name, this dish did not originate in Fujian. The recipe was invented by Chinese restaurants in Taiwan, although Taiwanese cuisine is heavily influenced by Fujian cuisine.

See also
 Fried rice
 List of fried rice dishes

American Chinese cuisine
American rice dishes
Cantonese cuisine
Chinese rice dishes
Fried rice
Hong Kong cuisine
Taiwanese rice dishes